Autoroute 20 may refer to:
 A20 autoroute, in France
 Quebec Autoroute 20, in Quebec, Canada

See also 
  List of A20 roads
 List of highways numbered 20